The BMW Car Club of America Foundation was formed in 2002 by the BMW Car Club of America to benefit BMW owners, enthusiasts, and the general public. As a 501(c)(3) non-profit charity, the Foundation operates a museum, library, and archives and a teen safe driving educational program.

The foundation focuses on two programs: 
The Library, Archives, and Museum Program
The Teen Driver Safety Program (Street Survival)

The Museum, Library, and Archives 
The BMW CCA Foundation Museum displays a collection of Vintage BMW Cars, Motorcycles, and artifacts on a rotating basis. Each year, a new theme is selected for the annual exhibit, with a new selection of automobiles. The Library and Archives is a repository of BMW-related historical documents, literature, automobiles and memorabilia. This facility is in Greer, South Carolina near the BMW Car Club of America National Office, BMW Plant Spartanburg and the BMW Performance Center.

The Driver Safety School Program 
The Driver Safety Program promotes and conducts driving programs to improve the car handling skills of young drivers, especially teenagers, with the aim of reducing accidents. This program is headlined by the “Tire Rack Street Survival Teen Driving Program” that is conducted across the United States.  Additionally, this program features Car Control Clinics for drivers of all ages to learn the dynamics of their cars in emergency situations in a safe and controlled environment.

External links
BMW CCA Foundation and Museum site
Tire Rack Street Survival site
BMW CCA
BMW CCA Club Racing site

CCA Foundation
Non-profit organizations based in South Carolina